John Anthony may refer to:

Sir John Anthony (1862–1935), Scottish businessman who served as Provost of Govan, 1904–1908
John Anthony (physician) (1585–1655), English physician
John Gould Anthony (1804–1877), United States naturalist
John Anthony (sport shooter) (1932–2009), British Olympic shooter
John Anthony (record producer) (born 1944), British music producer
John Anthony (footballer) (born 1953), Australian rules footballer for St Kilda
John D. Anthony (born 1976), Illinois politician
Jack Anthony (footballer) (born 1988), Australian rules footballer for Collingwood and Fremantle

See also

Jack Anthony (disambiguation)